Jeanette "Jinny" Rosemary Janvrin (1931–2018) was acclaimed as Britain's perfect secretary in 1953.  She subsequently married Henry Brandon and became Lady Brandon of Oakbrook when he became a Law Lord in 1981.

References

1931 births
2018 deaths
Brandon of Oakbrook
People from Kolkata
Spouses of life peers
Secretaries